William F. Pfann (1863–1904) was a professional baseball player. He was a pitcher for the Cincinnati Reds of the National League in 1894. He appeared in one game for the Reds on June 16, 1894.

References

1863 births
1904 deaths
19th-century baseball players
Baseball players from Hamilton, Ontario
Canadian expatriate baseball players in the United States
Cincinnati Reds players
Hamilton Clippers players
Hamilton Primrose players
Hamilton Hams players
Major League Baseball pitchers
Major League Baseball players from Canada